The 1999–2000 Winthrop Eagles men's basketball team represented Winthrop University during the 1999–2000 college basketball season. This was head coach Gregg Marshall's second season at Winthrop. The Eagles competed in the Big South Conference and played their home games at Winthrop Coliseum. They finished the season 21–9, 11–3 in Big South play to finish second in the conference regular season standings. They won the 2000 Big South Conference men's basketball tournament to receive the conference's automatic bid to the 2000 NCAA Division I men's basketball tournament as No. 14 seed in the West region. The Eagles lost to No. 3 seed Oklahoma in the opening round.

Roster 

Source

Schedule and results
Source
All times are Eastern

|-
!colspan=9 style=| Non-conference regular season

|-
!colspan=9 style=| Big South Regular Season

|-
!colspan=9 style=| Big South tournament

|-
!colspan=9 style=| NCAA tournament

References

Winthrop
Winthrop
Winthrop Eagles men's basketball seasons
Winthrop Eagles
Winthrop Eagles